John E. Adams (born 16 July 1960) is a Dominican Republic judoka. He competed in the 1984 Summer Olympics.

References

1960 births
Living people
Judoka at the 1984 Summer Olympics
Dominican Republic male judoka
Olympic judoka of the Dominican Republic